The Australian men's national para ice hockey team (also known as the Aussie Ice Roos) is the ice sledge hockey team representing Australia.  The team made its debut at the 2018 World Para Ice Hockey Championships (Pool C) in Finland.

History
In 2017, the Australian Para Ice Hockey Association was formed with sponsorship from the Australian Paralympic Committee (APC) and Ice Sports Australia. The APC received a grant from the International Paralympic Committee’s (IPC) development arm the Agitos Foundation to grow participation opportunities and to purchase equipment (21 Para-ice hockey sledges and sticks, as well as telescoping noses and picks) for the sport in Australia. Para Ice Hockey Qld in Brisbane received 1 sled of the 21 purchased however in parallel it received a substantial grant from the Queensland Government which enabled it to purchase the bulk of equipment needed to establish the sport.  Initial games were held in Melbourne, Perth and Brisbane.

During the 2018 anmd 2019 Canada vs USA Ice Hockey Classic games held at Sydney's Qudos Bank Arena Brisbane's Entertainment Centre, and Sydney's International Convention Centre, Para Ice Hockey Qld's Kelvin Mickelson coordinated exhibition events which included many generous supporters and three para ice hockey demonstration events to an audience of 25,000. The demonstration games featured Winter Paralympians including Michael Milton, Joany Badenhorst, Sam Tait and Tori Pendergast.

In 2018,  Kelvin Mickelson (President and Founder of Para Ice Hockey Qld), and Blair Ivens (President of Ice Hockey Qld) submitted  a proposal to Ice Hockey Australia and Paralympics Australia for Ice Hockey Australia to include 'Para Ice Hockey' under its governance.   This eventuated in April 2021.

Competition history
In November 2018, Australia debuted internationally at the 2018 World Para Ice Hockey Championships in Pool C competing against Finland and China.
Australia suffered two losses; the first to Finland 6–1, followed by China 40–0.  They placed third in the Pool C Championships.

Jarred Liddicoat (Captain) scored Australia's first international Para Ice Hockey goal against Finland. and was awarded the overall World Para Ice Hockey World Championships (Pool C) Most Valuable Player.

Tournament record

World Para Ice Hockey Championships
2018 - Bronze (Pool C)

Roster

2018 World Para Ice Hockey Championships (C-Pool) Roster
Team Members - Darren Belling (QLD), Joe Chivers (Tas), Geoff Cook (QLD), Marty Jackson (Vic) - Alternate Captain, Tao Joos (NSW), Jarred Liddicoat (QLD) - Captain, Ziggy Markovic (Vic), Xavier Player (Vic) - Alternate Captain, Jason Sauer (QLD), Bill Siegloff (Vic) - Management - Andrew McDowell (Chef de Mission), Emma Poynton (general manager), Gary Farmer (head coach), Ben Stadtmiller (assistant coach)

See also

Australia men's national ice hockey team

References

External links
Australian Para Ice Hockey Association Facebook

National ice sledge hockey teams
Ice Sledge Hockey